Curveulima obliquistoma is a species of sea snail, a marine gastropod mollusk in the family Eulimidae. The species is one of a number within the genus Curveulima.

Description
The length of the shell attains 4 mm.

Distribution
This species occurs in the following locations:
 European waters (ERMS scope); in the Atlantic Ocean off between the isles Pico and Saint-George.

References

External links
 Bouchet, P. & Warén, A., 1986. Revision of the northeast Atlantic bathyal and abyssal Aclididae, Eulimidae, Epitoniidae. Bollettino Malacologico: 297-576, sér. Suppl.2
 To World Register of Marine Species

Eulimidae
Gastropods described in 1986